The following is a list of assets owned by the Coca-Cola Company. The Coca-Cola Company had equity positions in 51 unconsolidated bottling, canning and distribution operations which produced approximately 58% of volume. Significant investees include:

Former assets
Beverage Partners Worldwide (50%; co-owned with Nestlé)
Columbia Pictures
Columbia Pictures Television
TriStar Pictures
TriStar Television
RCA/Columbia Pictures Home Video/RCA/Columbia Pictures International Video (Half owned by RCA)
Coca-Cola Telecommunications
Embassy Pictures
Merv Griffin Enterprises

See also
 Lists of corporate assets
 List of Coca-Cola brands

References

Coca-Cola Company
Coca-Cola